This is a list of holidays in Easter Island.

List 

.

References

Public holidays in Chile
Easter Island
Public holidays in Oceania